Gastón Gaudio was the defending champion but lost in the quarterfinals to Flávio Saretta.

Juan Carlos Ferrero won in the final 6–2, 6–4 against Christophe Rochus.

Seeds
A champion seed is indicated in bold text while text in italics indicates the round in which that seed was eliminated.

  Juan Carlos Ferrero (champion)
  Marat Safin (first round)
  Àlex Corretja (first round)
  Gastón Gaudio (quarterfinals)
  Agustín Calleri (quarterfinals)
  Mariano Zabaleta (first round)
  José Acasuso (first round)
  David Sánchez (second round)

Draw

External links
 Singles draw
 Qualifying draw

Singles